Christian Brethren Church, East Fort is one of the Christian Worship Centers (Church) in the Thrissur city, in Kerala, India. The place derived its name from an old fort located at the eastern side of Thekkinkadu maidan.

Places of interest

East fort junction is a heavy traffic junction in the city where many major education institutions and hospitals are situated. Many banks have their branches in East fort.

Our Lady of Lourdes Syro-Malabar Catholic Metropolitan Cathedral
Jubilee Mission Medical College and Research Institute
Selex Mall

Location in context

References

Suburbs of Thrissur city